Milajerd District is a district (bakhsh) in Komijan County, Markazi Province, Iran. At the 2006 census, its population was 18,547, in 4,566 families.  The District has one city: Milajerd.The District has two rural districts (dehestan): Khosrow Beyk Rural District and Milajerd Rural District.

References 

Komijan County
Districts of Markazi Province